Sadie Elizabeth Sink (born April 16, 2002) is an American actress. She began acting at age seven in local theater productions, and played the title role in Annie (2012–14) and young Queen Elizabeth II in The Audience (2015) on Broadway. She made her television debut in a 2013 episode of The Americans and her film debut in the sports film Chuck (2016).

Sink had her breakthrough portraying Max Mayfield in the Netflix science fiction series Stranger Things (2017–present). In 2021, she appeared in the horror film trilogy Fear Street and played the lead role in Taylor Swift's short film All Too Well. Sink has since starred in Darren Aronofsky's psychological drama The Whale (2022), for which she was nominated for the Critics' Choice Movie Award for Best Young Performer.

Early life
Sadie Elizabeth Sink was born in Brenham, Texas, on April 16, 2002. the daughter of a math teacher mother and a football coach father. She has three older brothers and a younger sister. While her family was sports-oriented, she was interested in performing arts. She began acting in community theater with a production of The Best Christmas Pageant Ever in Brenham at age seven. She then successfully auditioned for the lead role in a local production of The Secret Garden. After this experience, she decided to further pursue an acting career. When she was a teenager, her family supported her acting career by moving to New Jersey due to its proximity to New York City.

Career

Sink performed in plays at Theater Under the Stars in Houston during the 2011–2012 season, including musical productions of White Christmas (2011) and the title role in Annie (2012). She made her Broadway debut in the 2012–14 Annie revival, playing both Annie and Duffy. During the Broadway run, she made her television debut in 2013 in an episode of the Emmy Award-winning series The Americans. She also played a guest role in an episode of the police procedural series Blue Bloods (2014).

In 2015, Sink played Suzanne Ballard in the NBC action thriller series American Odyssey, and portrayed a young Queen Elizabeth II alongside Helen Mirren in the Broadway production of The Audience. She attended school while appearing in small roles in television and film, such as Kimberly in the 2016 sports drama film Chuck, a guest character in an episode of the sitcom Unbreakable Kimmy Schmidt, and young Lori Walls in the biographical drama film The Glass Castle (2017). Sink auditioned for Max Mayfield for the second season of Netflix's science fiction horror drama series Stranger Things, and was cast as a series regular in October 2016. Max proved to be Sink's breakthrough role, becoming a fan-favorite character and an integral part of the series.

In 2018, she collaborated with Rooney Mara, Sia, Joaquin Phoenix, and Kat von D to narrate the animal rights Australian documentary film Dominion. She also walked the runway at Paris Fashion Week, making her modeling debut at age 15. The Hollywood Reporter listed Sink as one of the top 30 stars under age 18, and Variety listed her on their Young Hollywood Up Next Report. Sink, along with her Stranger Things cast members, was nominated for the SAG Award for Outstanding Performance by an Ensemble in a Drama Series. The following year, Sink played a supporting role in the Netflix horror film Eli.

In 2021, she played the main role of Ziggy Berman in the acclaimed The Fear Street Trilogy, appearing in the second and third installments, Fear Street Part Two: 1978 and Fear Street Part Three: 1666. Her performance in the former received critical praise, with Lovia Gyarkye of The Hollywood Reporter writing that she makes the role her own, and Empires Ian FreerSink calling her "the stand-out". She then played the lead in Taylor Swift's 2021 short film All Too Well: The Short Film opposite Dylan O'Brien, receiving critical acclaim for her performance. In 2022, she played the lead role of Tess DeNunzio in the drama Dear Zoe (2022).

Sink's performance in the fourth season of Stranger Things, particularly the episode "Dear Billy", received acclaim as well. The A.V. Clubs Saloni Gajjar said she "sinks into her role and ends up delivering the best performance of the gang, especially in the outstanding fourth episode", while Valerie Ettenofear of /Film praised her "traumatizingly good performance", and Variety Daniel D'Addario stated that she "distinguished herself as a major young performer throughout the season". For her performance, Sink won the Hollywood Critics Association Award for Best Supporting Actress in a Streaming Series, Drama, and received a Saturn Award nomination for Performance by a Younger Actor. She played Ellie, the troubled daughter of an overweight gay man, in Darren Aronofsky's drama film The Whale (2022). Hannah Strong of Little White Lies praised Sink's "tricky role" in which she "captures the anger and sadness that comes from parental abandonment".

Sink will next feature in the thriller film Berlin Nobody, an adaptation of Nicholas Hogg's 2015 novel Tokyo.

Personal life
Sink became a vegetarian in 2015, then went vegan the following year after her Glass Castle co-star Woody Harrelson convinced her to try it. She now describes herself as a passionate vegan.

Filmography

Film

Television

Stage

Awards and nominations

References

External links

 
 
 
 

2002 births
21st-century American actresses
American child actresses
American film actresses
American stage actresses
American television actresses
Actresses from Texas
Living people
People from Brenham, Texas